Cornelis Lambertus Mijnders (28 September 1912 – 1 April 2002) was a Dutch football forward who was selected for the Netherlands in the 1934 FIFA World Cup. He also played for DFC.

References

External links
 FIFA profile

1912 births
2002 deaths
1934 FIFA World Cup players
Association football forwards
Dutch footballers
FC Dordrecht players
Netherlands international footballers
Footballers from Eindhoven